Qarahchi or Qarehchi may refer to:
 Qarahchi-ye Olya, Ardabil Province
 Qarahchi-ye Sofla, Ardabil Province
 Qarahchi-ye Ahmadabad, East Azerbaijan Province
 Qarahchi Qeran, Kurdistan Province